Simplii Financial is a direct bank and the digital banking division of the Canadian Imperial Bank of Commerce (CIBC). 

As of November 2021, the bank had almost two million clients.

In 2021, Simplii Financial became the first in Canadian banking to enable digital identity verification – giving international students and newcomers the opportunity to open accounts completely digitally before arriving in Canada.

Background
Simplii Financial was established following CIBC and the supermarket chain Loblaw Companies mutually deciding to end their 20-year joint venture of providing consumer banking services under the President's Choice Financial brand.

Simplii Financial shares Institution Number 010 with its parent CIBC. Its SWIFT code is CIBCCATT, and all Simplii clients share a branch-transit number of 30800.

History
Simplii traces its history back to the 1996 President's Choice Financial co-venture between CIBC and Loblaws to provide low-fee banking services. President's Choice Financial operated out of pavilions in various Loblaw-owned supermarkets but had no formal branches; instead, CIBC and PCF customers could use either brands' bank machines for no charge. In August 2017 the two co-venture partners decided to end the relationship.

Effective November 1, 2017 all two million President's Choice Financial bank accounts – as well as loans, mortgages, and investments – were transferred to Simplii, with Loblaws retaining their credit card portfolio issued by the separately chartered President's Choice Bank. Because CIBC was already the account provider for PCF bank accounts and other consumer products (excluding credit card and insurance services), all account numbers and terms remained the same. The first day of operations for the Simplii brand saw glitches in the mobile banking app, long call centre wait times, and customers reporting confusion about when to expect their new debit cards. The division switched customers to new cards in March 2018, with some complaints about temporarily frozen accounts.

In May 2018, Simplii and the Bank of Montreal were targets of hackers who claimed to have compromised the systems of both banks and stolen information on an originally-reported 90,000 combined customers. It was later confirmed that BMO had over 110,000 clients impacted by the data breach, while about 10,000 Simplii customers were affected by the hack. An email sent from a Russian address and attributed to the hackers demanded a US$1 million ransom paid via Ripple by end of day on May 28, 2018 or the stolen information would be released. Two men from Montreal were later arrested in September 2020 by RCMP for the cyberattacks and charged with unauthorized use of a computer, identity theft and possession of a device to obtain unauthorized use of computers.

About 1,200 Simplii customers had their accounts withdrawn in the attack, with the financial institution immediately returning all funds to its clients. Simplii offered its affected customers credit monitoring and identity theft insurance for free at the time of the breach, while also gifting $100 prepaid VISA cards in goodwill. 

In June 2018, it was reported that there were proposed class-action lawsuits filed against Simplii Financial and BMO for the data breaches, which were settled in April 2021. The parties agreed to settle the action against BMO for $21.2 million, and against Simplii’s parent-company CIBC for $1.8 million. 

Simplii Financial was listed in Forbes magazine's World's Best Banks 2019 list, which also ranked it the third best bank in Canada.

Products

 Banking accounts – No fee chequing, high interest savings and USD savings accounts along with e-Transfers, mobile and online banking options
 Mortgages – variable and fixed residential 
 Line of credit – personal loans, secured lines of credit and creditor insurance
 Credit card – Simplii Financial Cash Back Visa Card
 Investment products including GICs, RRSPs, TFSAs and mutual funds
Simplii Financial Visa Digital Gift Card
Global money transfers

Awards 
Since being founded in 2017, Simplii Financial has captured the most digital-banking awards, and was one of the major winners across all Canadian financial institutions and banking brands in the 2022 Ipsos Financial Service Excellence Awards with three wins. 

The Ipsos Financial Service Excellence Awards included a win for Mobile Banking Excellence, fulfilling digital banking needs that became more pronounced in recent years. 

The full list of winning categories for Simplii Financial in 2022 were:

 Value for Money
 Recommend to Family and Friends
 Mobile Banking Excellence 

Simplii Financial has also been voted by clients as one of Forbes’ World’s Best Banks in Canada four years in a row (2019, 2020, 2021, 2022).

See also

 List of banks in Canada
 Alterna Savings
 Motive Financial
 Tangerine

References

External links
 

Canadian companies established in 2017
Banks established in 2017
Banks of Canada
Canadian Imperial Bank of Commerce
Online banks
Companies based in Toronto
Mortgage lenders of Canada
Neobanks